The Juche faction, also known by its Korean name Juchesasangpa and Korean abbreviation Jusapa, was a political faction within South Korea's student movements that supported the North Korean political ideology known as Juche. It was most prominent during the pro-democracy demonstrations of the 1980s, and was part of the wider National Liberation faction.

History

Background
After the division of Korea and the Korean War, most of the left-leaning political groups went underground. However, as the oppression of democratic protests by the government and the fall of the "Seoul Spring" in the 1980s as a result of the rise of the reign of military general Chun Doo-hwan made fervors grim, the influx of juche ideology occurred. The dominance of jusapa became apparent after a fight between groups with different views.

Origin
The movement started around early 1986 among the Undongkwon participating in student movements and labor movements. A book written by  called "The Letter of One Labor Activist Sending to All Our Fellow Young Students" with the pseudonym "Kang Chol", also known as "kangcholsoshin" (Kang cheol's letter), was considered as the textbook of the movement among participants. The movement was also called the National Liberation faction (NL) because it emphasized the "national liberation" of South Korea based on the theory of North Korean revolution called "The Theory of Revolution of People's Democracy and National Liberation". However, "National Liberation faction" can also mean groups who did not accept Juche but with the same perception that the people of South Korea should be liberated.

Fall of communism and its subsequent decline
The  anti-communist laws in South Korea have had—and continue to have—a negative effect on the perception of Juche ideology in South Korea. However, after constitutional democracy was established after mass demonstrations in 1987, the focus of the movement shifted to encouraging the unification of the two Koreas. This led "" (often shortened to ) to send representatives to the "Korean nation festival" in 1987 in Pyongyang. After the fall of the Soviet Union, the death of Kim Il-sung and the news reports of famines in North Korea in 1995, the movement faced a subsequent decline. However, in 1994, Park Hong, who was the president of Sogang University at the time, held a press conference claiming North Korea was running a terrorist organization in schools citing jusapas and sanomaeng (South Korean Socialist Workers' Alliance) as examples, which renewed interest in the movement. The statement was made in the context of incidents of students being arrested for making a place to mourn the death of Kim Il-sung.

Criticism
Certain leftist movements in South Korea are often referred to as "chinbuk", "Jongbuk" and "Jusapa" (Juche proponent) by Korean conservatives, anti-communists and others critical of the North. This perception is reinforced by cases such as Lim Su-kyung, who is best known for attending the 13th World Festival of Youth and Students, held in North Korea and praising President of North Korea Kim Il Sung in 1989. She attended the festival representing the student organization Jeondaehyop, now known as Hanchongryun. In April 2012, she was elected as a member of the 19th National Assembly as the Democratic United Party's 21st proportional representative. In June 2012, in a confrontation with a North Korean defector in a bar, Lim hurled insults and referred to a ruling party lawmaker as a "son-of-a-bitch betrayer" and another as a "traitor" in what has been described by Korea JoonAng Daily as "an alcohol-fueled tirade at a Seoul restaurant", questioning their legitimacy to challenge her as a lawmaker. This led to public protests.

See also 
Juche
National Security Act
National Liberation faction 
Student movements in Korea

References

External links
 북 관련 글 퍼나르고 올린 죄…세상은 날 ‘간첩’으로 몰았다
 평범했던 그들은 왜 ‘김정일 만세’를 외치게 됐나

Communism in South Korea
Juche political parties
Left-wing nationalism in South Korea
Anti-sadaejuui
Far-left politics in South Korea
Political movements in South Korea